The Zimbabwe cricket team toured Bangladesh in October 2018 to play two Tests and three One Day International (ODI) matches. Bangladesh won the ODI series 3–0. Bangladesh's regular Test captain, Shakib Al Hasan, was unavailable due to injury. Therefore, Mahmudullah was named as captain of the squad in his absence.

Originally the tour was scheduled to take place in January and February 2019. However, in May 2018, it was announced that the series could be moved to October 2018, because of security concerns around the Bangladeshi general election, scheduled to take place at the same time. In July 2018, both the Bangladesh Cricket Board (BCB) and Zimbabwe Cricket (ZC) confirmed that it would be brought forward to October 2018. The fixtures were confirmed later in July 2018, with the Sylhet International Cricket Stadium scheduled to host its first Test match. During the first Test, it became Bangladesh's eighth Test venue.

Zimbabwe won the first Test by 151 runs. It was only their third away win in Tests and their first away win since 2001. Zimbabwe's last win in a Test match was five years earlier, against Pakistan in Harare. Bangladesh won the second Test by 218 runs, therefore drawing the series 1–1.

Squads

After the initial squads were announced, Sikandar Raza was added to Zimbabwe's side for both the Test and ODI matches. Soumya Sarkar was added to Bangladesh's squad for the third ODI. Richard Ngarava was ruled out of Zimbabwe's squad for the two Tests, with Christopher Mpofu replacing him.

Tour matches

50 over match: Bangladesh Cricket Board XI vs Zimbabwe

Three-day match: Bangladesh Cricket Board XI vs Zimbabwe

ODI series

1st ODI

2nd ODI

3rd ODI

Test series

1st Test

2nd Test

Notes

References

External links
 Series home at ESPN Cricinfo

2018 in Bangladeshi cricket
2018 in Zimbabwean cricket
International cricket competitions in 2018–19
Zimbabwean cricket tours of Bangladesh